Barclays Arena may refer to:

Barclays Arena (Hamburg)
Barclays Center, New York